The Zhongzhu Levee is a levee in Dongyin Township, Lienchiang County, Taiwan. It connects Xiyin Island and Dongyin Island.

History
The construction of the levee was completed in 1986.

Architecture
The levee spans over a length 500 meters. At the center of the levee, lies the Ganen Pavilion with the statue of former President Chiang Ching-kuo facing south.

References

1986 establishments in Taiwan
Buildings and structures in Lienchiang County
Dikes
Infrastructure completed in 1986
Tourist attractions in Lienchiang County